HD 39194 (Gliese 217.2; LHS 210) is  a star located in the southern circumpolar constellation Mensa. It has an apparent magnitude of 8.07, making it readily visible in binoculars but not to the naked eye.

Characteristics 
HD 39194 has a general stellar classification of K0 V, indicating that it is a K-type main-sequence star. Houk & Cowley found a slightly warmer class of G8 V, instead making it a G-type main-sequence star. It radius of  yields a luminosity only 38% that of the Sun. HD 39194 is estimated to be 11.7 billion years old and is extremely chromospherically inactive. Despite being a planetary host, it has an iron abundance only 24% that of the Sun. HD 39194's projected rotational velocity is similar to the Sun's, with the value being .

Planetary system
This star was selected as a potential candidate for exoplanets beginning in 2015. After 7 years of observations, a team of astronomers discovered 3 super-Earths circling HD 39194 in eccentric orbits; none of the planets are in the habitable zone. HD 39194 b and d have similar masses.

See also
 List of multiplanetary systems
 Pi Mensae, another exoplanet-hosting star in the same constellation.

References

K-type main-sequence stars
Planetary systems with three confirmed planets
Mensa (constellation)
039194
027080
0217.2
CD-70 340
High-proper-motion stars